The 2003 Wyndham New Orleans Bowl featured the North Texas Mean Green and the Memphis Tigers. It was North Texas's third consecutive New Orleans Bowl appearance.

Kicker Nick Bazaldua got North Texas on the board first with a 47-yard field goal to give the team an early 3–0 lead. Memphis quarterback Danny Wimprine scored on a 7-yard touchdown run to give Memphis a 7–3 lead. In the second quarter, Wimprine found Chris Kelley for a 10-yard touchdown pass, and a 14–3 lead. Stephen Gostkowski connected on a 21-yard field goal before halftime, to increase the lead to 17–3.

In the third quarter, running back Patrick Cobbs scored on a 35-yard touchdown run to bring the score to 17–10. In the fourth quarter, running back LaKendus Cole scored on a 5-yard touchdown run to increase the lead to 24–10. Patrick Cobbs scored his second touchdown on a 2-yard run to bring the score to 24–17. Stephen Gostkowski finished the scoring with a 42-yard field goal, to make the final 27–17.

References

External links
USA Today game summary

New Orleans Bowl
New Orleans Bowl
Memphis Tigers football bowl games
North Texas Mean Green football bowl games
December 2003 sports events in the United States
2003 in sports in Louisiana